The 2011–12 1. FC Köln season began on 31 July 2011 against Wiedenbrück 2000 in a DFB-Pokal 1st round match. They club played its home matches at the RheinEnergieStadion.

For the season, the club hired Ståle Solbakken as its new head coach. The board of directors announced their resignation at the annual general meeting. Speculation concerning Lukas Podolski's future at 1. FC Köln has been written about a lot during the season. 1. FC Köln were eliminated from the DFB-Pokal in the 2nd Round. The club was in tenth place halfway through the season. The club went to Portimão, Portugal, during the winter break. Unfortunately, the team had an alarming slump in form in the second half of the season, coinciding with news that their star player Lukas Podolski had signed for Arsenal on 30 April and would join the team on 1 July. They were officially relegated from the Bundesliga after their 4–1 home loss to second-placed Bayern Munich on 5 May on the final day of the 2011–12 Bundesliga season.

Review and events

Off-season
Prior to the last match of last season, 1. FC Köln hired Ståle Solbakken as their new head coach. He previously coached Copenhagen. Also on the last matchday of last season, Petit tore his anterior cruciate ligament in a match against Schalke 04 and has yet to debut this season.

Pre-season
Arsenal defeated 1. FC Köln 2–1. On 25 July, Solbakken named Pedro Geromel captain. Lukas Podolski was Geromel's predecessor.

Season
On 31 July, 1. FC Köln opened up their season with a 3–0 DFB-Pokal win against Wiedenbrück 2000.

1. FC Köln were eliminated from the DFB-Pokal in the 2nd Round.

On 13 November, Wolfgang Overath along with deputies Friedrich Neukirch and Jürgen Glowacz resigned from the board of directors. Overath stated how there was a "strain in recent months" for all of them and "frustration, inner conflict, and wear and tear". Overath also stated how the board was "not always a team" and how he "was reviled and insulted in a way, as I have never experienced before.".

On 19 November, the match against Mainz 05 was canceled after the referee for the match, Babak Rafati, attempted suicide. The match was eventually rescheduled for 13 December.

1. FC Köln stated that they would allow Sebastian Freis and Kevin Pezzoni to leave on free transfers.

For the winter break, 1. FC Köln returned to practice on 2 January 2012 at 11:00 CET (UTC+01) and had a training camp in Portimão, Portugal, from 5 to 12 January.

On 4 March 2012, a group 1. FC Köln supporters attacked a bus with Borussia Mönchengladbach supporters in it.

On 10 March 2012, 1. FC Köln announced, that in mutual agreement, Volker Finke will be released from his position as Sporting Director.

On 12 April 2012, 1. FC Köln dismissed Ståle Solbakken as head coach of the club and replaced him with Frank Schaefer. The club was in 16th place at the time of the firing. The club originally announced that he was "on leave". However, Solbakken confirmed that he was fired.

1. FC Köln finished in 17th place and were relegated on the final day of the season. Hertha BSC would have been automatically been relegated if they had lost or drew against 1899 Hoffenheim.

Lukas Podolski
Lukas Podolski's future at 1. FC Köln has been speculated much during the first half of the season by the media. Turkish media announced how Podolski and Galatasaray S.K. had already agreed. These rumours were proved false when Podolski was still at 1. FC Köln when the transfer deadline passed. In August, Sports Director Volker Finke stated how the club absolutely must keep Podolski at all cost.

Arsenal, Lokomotiv Moscow, Galatasaray S.K., Lazio and Schalke 04 are all known to be interested in Podolski and have been tracking him during the first half of season. However, it would be difficult for Schalke 04 to sign Podolski. Podolski stated that "a change in the Bundesliga is for me very difficult to imagine". Arsène Wenger has denied that he wants to purchase Podolski during the winter transfer period. Die Welt has reported that Wenger has no interest in Podolski at all.

Finke stated on 11 December that, "Podolski would not be part of the squad for 2012–13, if he did not sign an extension," while Podolski responded by stating, "he would be willing to play for the amateurs or sit in the stands while his current deal expired". 1. FC Köln is about €25 million in debt and Finke doesn't believe that 1. FC Köln can afford a free transfer. Deutsche Welle stated that the "more logical decision" would be to sell Podolski during the winter transfer period because he is not cup-tied to any club in UEFA's European competitions and how their position to sell would be weaken if they wait for next summer.

Jürgen Klopp came out and criticized Podolski. Klopp stated how Podolski only plays well every other week and is too expensive because of this. Podolski stated how he turned down Klopp twice and how Borussia Dortmund could not afford him because it does have any more UEFA Champions League revenue for the season.

Arsenal F.C. defender Per Mertesacker stated how Podolski, along with former Arsenal striker Thierry Henry, would be "perfect acquisitions". On 7 March, Mertesacker stated that Podolski has asked about "a potential move to the Emirates". Oliver Bierhoff stated that Podolski would be making a "great move" if he left 1. FC Köln for Arsenal F.C.

There were reports that claimed 1. FC Köln sold Podolski to Arsenal F.C. for €13 million with Bayern Munich getting 10% of the amount over €10 million. However, Podolski himself denied that any deal has been finalized with Arsenal F.C. Reports doubted that the move will even happen after Podolski claimed that he could be tempted by Lazio.

Podolski finally decided to sign for Arsenal on 30 April.

Matches

Legend

Bundesliga

DFB-Pokal

Squad information

Transfers

In

Out

Roster, appearances, goals and assists

Sources

1. FC Köln seasons
Koln season 2011-12